Igor Flores Galarza (born 5 December 1973 in Urdiain, Navarre) is a Spanish former professional road bicycle racer, who rode professionally between 1996 and 2002, entirely for the  team.

In 2002, Flores finished last in the Tour de France. Igor Flores is the brother of Iker Flores, who finished last in the 2005 Tour de France.

Major results

1997
 1st Stage 8 Ruta Azteca
2001
 1st Stage 4 Vuelta Ciclista a la Rioja
2002
 1st Trofeo Manacor, Port d'Alcudia

Grand Tour general classification results timeline

External links 

1973 births
Living people
People from Barranca (comarca)
Spanish male cyclists
Cyclists from Navarre